Ong Poh Lim (18 November 1923 – 17 April 2003) was a Malayan/Singaporean badminton player who had won numerous national and international titles from the late 1940s to the early 1960s. Known for his quickness and his aggressive, unorthodox playing style, Ong won many singles and doubles titles, including the Singapore, Malayan, All-England, French, Danish and Thomas Cup championships in the 1940s and 1950s. He also invented the backhand flick serve known as the “crocodile serve”, a tactic that had been routinely used in the modern game. Ong was a keen rival to badminton legend Wong Peng Soon.

Early life 
Ong was born on 18 November 1923, in Kuching, Sarawak. He was the son of Mr Ong and Mrs Ong Kheng Hong. 

Ong, then a student of St. Thomas's School, Kuching, took a serious interest in badminton only after the visit of two Singapore badminton champions Leow Kim Fatt and Yap Chin Tee to Kuching in 1937. In June 1947, he went to Singapore to work as well as looking for opportunity to improve his attacking game. He was greatly assisted by Yap Chin Tee, a former high level player in Singapore.

Badminton career 
Ong excelled in badminton during his school days and held the Sarawak singles and doubles titles from 1938 to 1941. He moved to Singapore after World War II, where he played for Marigold Badminton Party, a well-established rival to Mayflower Badminton Party, which produced Wong Peng Soon and a number of other prominent badminton players of that era.

Ong won the Singapore Open men's singles title four times from 1952 to 1955 and the men's doubles title nine times with seven in consecutive years from 1950 to 1956 with Ismail Marjan. He also created history by capturing the Singapore Open singles, doubles and mixed doubles titles over three consecutive years, from 1952 to 1954.

Ong held the Malaysia Open men's singles title two times in 1954 and 1956, the men's doubles title four times in 1950, 1953, 1956 with Ismail Marjan and in 1955 with Ooi Teik Hock.

Ong also won many international titles in his tour of Europe and US. He won both the Irish Open men's singles and men's doubles titles in 1949 with Lim Kee Fong. He won the Denmark Open men's doubles titles in 1951 and 1952 with Ismail Marjan. He also won the French Open men's singles and men's doubles titles in 1951, again with Ismail Marjan. Ong shared the All-England men's doubles title in 1954 with Ooi Teik Hock, having previously reached the finals of both singles and doubles at the All-England in 1951. As a pair, they also won the US Open men's doubles title in the same calendar year (1954). Ong played on three consecutive world champion Malayan Thomas Cup teams (1949, 1952, 1955) and won all of his individual matches in these contests. In the latter part of his career he represented Singapore in international competition.

After his retirement, Ong took on coaching roles in Malaysia (1976), Iran (1978) and the Philippines (1980). Ong is credited for having trained Lee Kin Tat, who reached the semi-finals of the All-England in 1964 and 1966; and the two-time All-England champion of 1965 and 1967, Tan Yee Khan.

Ong's famous crocodile serve apparently came about by accident. He had a slight limp and he compensated this by "wiggling his behind, a little like Marilyn Monroe" (in his own words) before executing a quick back-hand flick serve to fool his opponents. And he did all these naturally. Because he was originally from Sarawak where the rivers were infested with crocodiles, a British journalist coined his peculiar serve after them.

Personal life 
Ong, remained a bachelor for his whole life and he lived alone at Sennett Close. 

Besides badminton, Ong was also interested in antiques. He was a keen philatelist and amassed an extensive collection of rare and unusual stamps from all over the world, including those from Indonesia, Sarawak, Brunei and the Straits Settlements.

Death 
On 16 April 2003, SSC officials discovered Ong at his home, where he had suffered a bad fall and had been unattended for several days. He was taken to Changi General Hospital, where he died on 17 April. He was 79 years old. His funeral was attended by officials from the SSC and the Singapore Badminton Association (SBA). He was buried at Choa Chu Kang Christian Cemetery.

Awards 
In 1953, Ong was voted as the 1952 Sportsman of the Year by the readers of Singapore Free Press.

In 1986, Ong was inducted into the Singapore Sports Council (SSC) Sports Museum Hall of Fame. In 1996, he received a Meritorious Service Award from the International Badminton Federation (IBF) for his significant contribution to the growth of world badminton.

Ong was also inducted into the World Badminton Hall of Fame in 1998 as well as the Olympic Council of Malaysia’s Hall of Fame in 2004.

Achievements

International tournaments 
Men's doubles

References 

1923 births
2003 deaths
People from Kuching
Malaysian male badminton players
Singaporean male badminton players
Malaysian sportspeople of Chinese descent
Singaporean sportspeople of Chinese descent